Krasny Oktyabr is a rural locality (a village) in Dmitriyevsky Selsoviet, Chishminsky District, Bashkortostan, Russia. The population was 13 as of 2010. There is 1 street.

Geography 
Krasny Oktyabr is located 18 km north of Chishmy (the district's administrative centre) by road. Novotroyevka is the nearest rural locality.

References 

Rural localities in Chishminsky District